Corrin is the player avatar and main protagonist in Fire Emblem Fates. A Hoshidan prince/princess raised in Nohr, they are forced to decide which of two opposing nations to join, their birthplace or their adoptive homeland. Aside from their appearance in Fates, Corrin received more widespread attention from their playable appearances in Nintendo's Super Smash Bros. series of fighting games.

Characteristics 
As a descendant of the First Dragons, Corrin carries ancient Dragon Blood and is able to tap the power of Dragon Veins to change the surrounding terrain. However, Corrin is special in that they can transform into a dragon. They carry a dragonstone to assume control of their transforming abilities. Corrin wields the legendary katana Yato, which is said to belong to a chosen warrior capable of bringing peace to the world. The Yato is capable of changing its form when drawing power from the other four legendary weapons: Brynhildr, Fujin Yumi, Siegfried, and Raijinto. These transformations occur depending on the game's path.

Corrin is an outgoing but soft-spoken person, and they display a strong credulousness and enthusiasm to make friends with everyone they come across. However, because of their childhood spent in isolation, they are also naive and have virtually no experience with the outside world, causing them to be incredibly curious about new sights and other people's affairs. Corrin has strong familial ties with both the Hoshidan and Nohrian royal families and are reluctant to make enemies of any of them. They demonstrate an extreme sense of mercifulness and are generally opposed to the idea of taking lives.

Fictional biography 
Corrin was supposedly born to Sumeragi and Mikoto, the King and Queen of Hoshido, and had siblings in Ryoma (Hoshido's next-in-line), Hinoka, Takumi, and Sakura. Amidst a conflict between Hoshido and Nohr, Garon, the King of Nohr, trapped and assassinated Sumeragi, taking a baby Corrin under his wing and raising them as a member of Nohrian royalty alongside Xander (the crown prince), Camilla, Leo, and Elise. Corrin was confined within the walls of the Northern Fortress for fifteen years, and their memories were sealed away by a curse. During then, they only received the care of their retainers Flora, Felicia, Jakob, and their Nohrian siblings. In particular, Xander helped them train their swordsmanship skills.

One morning, Corrin is summoned by Xander for another training session, where they finally prove strong enough to win Garon's approval and be allowed to leave the Northern Fortress. Garon calls them to Castle Krakenburg in Windmire (Nohr's capital) and orders them to execute Hoshidan soldiers, including Kaze and Rinkah, giving them the cursed sword Ganglari. Corrin refuses, much to Garon's fury, but Xander and Leo step in and pretend to execute them themselves.

Garon orders Corrin to examine a fortress at the Bottomless Canyon alongside Nohrian generals Gunter and Hans to pardon their disobedience. Noticing that the fort is guarded by Hoshidan soldiers, Corrin and company start heading back, but Hans attacks Gunter and sends him falling into the Bottomless Canyon, much to Corrin's anger. The Ganglari flings Corrin into the canyon as well. Suddenly, Lilith, Corrin's stablehand, dives in after Corrin, transforming into an Astral Dragon to save them. She brings Corrin into the astral plane, where she establishes a place for Corrin to rest.

Once Corrin returns to the real world, they are ambushed and knocked out by Rinkah, then escorted by Kaze to Castle Shisaragi in Hoshido. Here, they meet Ryoma, their long-lost older brother, as well as their birth mother, Mikoto. Given Corrin's lack of memory, they meet Mikoto with indifference, not remembering her to be her birth mother. Word of Faceless humanoid beasts sent by Nohr attacking a nearby village reaches the castle, and Ryoma takes Corrin with him to fend them off. At the village, they meet with Hinoka and Sakura, who are similarly overjoyed by their long-lost sibling's return. Corrin later tours a nearby lake to collect their thoughts, where they meet Azura, a blue-haired songstress born in Nohr but kidnapped and raised in Hoshido.

A few days pass, and Corrin is still unable to recall any memory of her childhood. Mikoto still decides to introduce them to the people of Hoshido at the castle town. Suddenly, a hooded man approaches, calling the Ganglari into his hand. He plunges it into the ground, causing an immense explosion that destroys the town and injures the surrounding citizens. Shards of the blade are sent flying in Corrin's direction, but Mikoto jumps in and intercepts them, being fatally wounded in the process. Overcome with despair over Mikoto's death, Corrin transforms into a feral dragon and goes on a rampage. Azura approaches Corrin with her special pendant and song, managing to quell their rage. Corrin's memories come back, including those of Garon's assassination of Sumeragi. The Yato reveals itself from the destruction caused by the Ganglari and chooses Corrin as its wielder.

Mikoto's death causes the barrier around Hoshido that prevents incoming hostile attacks to disappear. Forces led by Nohrian royalty pursue Hoshido but are interrupted by the Hoshidan army, and Corrin finds themself at the center of the conflict. They must make a crucial, life-changing decision: stay in Hoshido to fight the Nohrian forces, return to Nohr and help them in their conquest of Hoshido, or take the hard road and refuse to pick sides.

Appearances

In Fire Emblem Fates 
Corrin is an avatar character whose name, gender and appearance can be customized by the player. They are a member of the Hoshidan royal family, but were kidnapped by King Garon of Nohr as an infant. In the opening battle between the two kingdoms, Corrin's two families meet, and Corrin is forced to choose between siding with Hoshido and Nohr. In the "Birthright" and "Conquest" routes, Corrin chooses either their biological or adopted family, respectively. This causes them to be denounced by the other side, and they are gradually forced to fight them. If Corrin marries, they are also able to marry and parent children.

In other media
Both male and female Corrin appear in Fire Emblem Heroes with various alternate costumes, including outfits based on young Azura's dreams, "Fallen" versions (where their primal instincts grow out of control), and a "Legendary" version featuring female Corrin as a Nohr Noble. Corrin also appears in Fire Emblem Echoes: Shadows of Valentia as a special unit that can only be summoned via amiibo. Female Corrin is a supporting character in Fire Emblem Warriors, with Male Corrin being unlockable in History Mode; they have also received additional costumes via the Fire Emblem Fates downloadable content pack. The female version of Corrin is featured as an Emblem In Fire Emblem Engage.

Outside the Fire Emblem series, Corrin is featured in Nintendo's Super Smash Bros. crossover fighting game series. They first appear as a playable character via paid downloadable content in Super Smash Bros. for Nintendo 3DS and Wii U and later returns as an unlockable character in Super Smash Bros. Ultimate. Here, Corrin uses the Omega Yato, the Yato's strongest form, and some of their attacks involve changing parts of their body into those of their dragon forms.

Merchandise 
To coincide with their appearance in Super Smash Bros., both male and female Corrin were released as Amiibo figures. Female Corrin has also received her own Nendoroid and Figma figures as well as a plush toy made by Sanei Boeki.

Reception 
Marianne Penn of TheGamer rated Corrin the worst lord in the Fire Emblem series, praising the design of both genders as "unique", but calling them "a huge waste of potential" due to the game's "insane and laughable story". Describing their personality as "way too naive", she stated that Corrin is nevertheless "liked by almost everyone they meet" and that they have "no right to be a lord".  Matthew Zawodniak of Nintendo World Report similarly criticized Corrin, taking issue with the "poor writing" attached to the character. However, he also acknowledged that, as the customizable avatar of the player, Corrin added more "personal stakes" to the player's relationship with both their allies and enemies, calling them a "conduit for the player to identify with the consequences of their choice."

Patrick Hancock of Destructoid praised Corrin's inclusion in Super Smash Bros. for Nintendo 3DS and Wii U, believing it helps them stand out from the game's other playable Fire Emblem characters. He stated that Corrin is distinguished by their ability to transform parts of their body into those of a dragon and that "surprisingly few of his moves actually use his sword." Calling Corrin "a well-rounded character", Hancock asserted that he "will likely see a lot of competitive play in the years to come".

In North American Fire Emblem character popularity polls running up to the release of Fire Emblem Heroes, Corrin was ranked number 9th out of all female characters and in the top 5 of a separate fan vote poll. In Famitsu's popularity poll for Fire Emblem Fates, male Corrin was ranked 5th of all male characters, and female Corrin was ranked 1st of all female characters. Corrin ranked 3rd in Nintendo Dream's Fire Emblem Fates popularity poll in the December 2015 issue. Gavin Jasper of Den of Geek ranked Corrin at 59th on his list of Super Smash Bros. Ultimate characters, criticized and stated that "Corrin felt fresh, but maybe not fresh enough for a DLC spot in Super Smash Bros. for Wii U," while Jeremy Parish of Polygon ranked 73 fighters from Super Smash Bros. Ultimate "from garbage to glorious", placing Corrin at 38th, also criticized and stated that "Another Fire Emblem fighter? Corrin is all decked out for serious combat, except they forgot their shoes."

Notes

References 

Fire Emblem characters
Adoptee characters in video games
Dragon characters in video games
Fictional demigods
Fictional human hybrids
Fictional humanoids
Fictional swordfighters in video games
Fictional war veterans
LGBT characters in video games
Nintendo protagonists
Orphan characters in video games
Shapeshifter characters in video games
Role-playing video game characters
Super Smash Bros. fighters
Teenage characters in video games
Video game characters who use magic
Video game characters with water abilities
Video game characters introduced in 2015
Video game characters of selectable gender
Nobility characters in video games
Video game protagonists
Fictional dragonslayers
Fictional bisexual females
Fictional bisexual males
Fictional defectors